The Aninoasa is a right tributary of the river Dâmbovița in Romania. It discharges into the Dâmbovița in Căprioru.

References

Rivers of Romania
Rivers of Dâmbovița County